Arthur Allardt (April 7, 1883 - 1940) was an actor in silent films. He appeared in several movies with Joseph Franz (actor).

Allardt was born in New York City.

Filmography
The Ranger's Reward (1914), short
Nugget Nell's Ward (1914)
The Poison (1914 film)
Strange Evidence (1914)
The Heart of Smiling Joe (1914 ) as the sheriff 
Through the Keyhole (1914 film)
The Gun Men of Plumas (1914)
The Fatal Card (1914 film)
The Runaway (1914 film)
Put Yourself in his Place (1914)
The Girl and the Hobo (1914)
 The Sheriff's Deputy (1914)
The Fight in Lonely Gulch
The Sheriff's Story (1914)
Memories of Years Ago (1914)
A Frontier Romance
The Curse of Eve (1917)
The Hidden Children (1917)
Alimony (1917 film) as Elijah Stone
Rose o' Paradise (1918) as Thomas Singleton
A Man's Man (1918) as Dr. Pacheo
One Dollar Bid (1918)
 Inside the Lines (1918)
Patriotism (1918 film) as Dr. Hyde
Louisiana (1919 film) as mountain youth Cass FloydThe Midnight Stage'' (1919)

References

1883 births
1940 deaths